Putnam is an unincorporated community in Putnam County, Illinois, United States. The community is located to the west of Senachwine Lake along Illinois Route 29, north of Henry.  

Putnam is the only village in Putnam County on the west side of the Illinois River.       The Putnam Christian Church celebrated its 150 anniversary in the summer of 2016.

Locals use the conveniently located hill next to the church to sled in the winter. The town's main attraction, "The Swimmin' Hole", is located just north of the town.

References

Unincorporated communities in Putnam County, Illinois
Unincorporated communities in Illinois